Ludovic (or Lewis) Lewis was a Welsh politician who sat in the House of Commons  from 1647 to 1653.

Lewis was the son of Sir William Lewis, 1st Baronet. In 1647, he was elected Member of Parliament for Brecon. He appears to have survived Pride's Purge to sit in the Rump Parliament
 
Lewis died presumably before his father in 1677 as he did not become baronet.

Lewis married Catherine Bickle, daughter of Sir Christopher Bickle of Banstead, Surrey. One of his daughters married John Lewis (of Coed Mawr), who was MP for Cardiganshire in 1685.

References

Year of birth missing
Year of death missing
Members of the Parliament of England (pre-1707) for constituencies in Wales
17th-century Welsh politicians
English MPs 1640–1648
English MPs 1648–1653